John McGinley may refer to:

 John C. McGinley (born 1959), American actor
 John McGinley (footballer) (born 1959), former English footballer
 John McGinley, the mayor of County Kildare and secretary of the Labour Party

See also
 John McGinlay (born 1964), former Scottish footballer